Hwang In-jae (born 22 April 1994) is a South Korean footballer currently playing as a goalkeeper for Pohang Steelers.

Club statistics
.

Notes

References

1994 births
Living people
South Korean footballers
Association football goalkeepers
K League 1 players
K League 2 players
Gwangju FC players
Ansan Greeners FC players
Seongnam FC players
Pohang Steelers players